List of all Clube de Regatas do Flamengo transfers in the 2011 season.

In

Out

References

List of Flamengo transfers 2011